Lac Gobeil Water Aerodrome  was located on Lac Gobeil, Quebec, Canada. It was open six months a year, from the middle of May until the middle of November.

See also
 Quebec (Attorney General) v. Lacombe

References

Defunct seaplane bases in Quebec